John "Hi" Simmons (August 16, 1905 – January 12, 1995) was the head baseball coach at the University of Missouri from 1937 until 1973.  During his tenure, Missouri won one national championship, finished runner-up three other times, appeared in six College World Series and won 11 conference titles.  Simmons' Missouri team won the 1954 College World Series and finished as runners-up in 1952, 1958 and 1964.  He also served as a football assistant coach under Don Faurot.  Simmons was inducted into the Missouri Sports Hall of Fame in 1977, the University of Missouri Hall of Fame in 1990, and is also a member of the ABCA Hall of Fame.  The field at Taylor Stadium is named Simmons Field in his honor. He died and is buried at Memorial Park Cemetery in Columbia, Missouri.

Head coaching record

References

1905 births
1995 deaths
Missouri Tigers baseball coaches
Missouri Tigers football coaches
University of Missouri faculty
People from Lancaster, Missouri
Burials at Memorial Park Cemetery (Columbia, Missouri)